The Journals of Susanna Moodie is a book of poetry by Margaret Atwood, first published in 1970.

In the book, Atwood adopts the voice of Susanna Moodie, a noted early Canadian writer, and attempts to imagine and convey Moodie's feelings about life in the Canada of her era. The book separates into three separate journals, which cover her arrival in 1832 to a post-death narration ending in 1969.
Journal One is from 1832–1840, Journal Two encompasses 1841–1870, and Journal Three continues on until 1969, wherein a dead Susanna Moodie comments on twentieth century Canada.

The book was later republished in 1997 with a new series of illustrations by artist Charles Pachter.

References
Atwood, Margaret (1970). The Journals of Susanna Moodie. Toronto: Oxford University Press. .

Poetry by Margaret Atwood
1970 poetry books
Canadian poetry collections
Oxford University Press books